Runaway Train is a 1985 American independent action thriller film directed by Andrei Konchalovsky and starring Jon Voight, Eric Roberts, Rebecca De Mornay and John P. Ryan. The screenplay by Djordje Milicevic, Paul Zindel and Edward Bunker was based on an original 1960s screenplay by Akira Kurosawa, with uncredited contributions by frequent Kurosawa collaborators Hideo Oguni and Ryūzō Kikushima. The film was also the feature debut of both Danny Trejo and Tommy "Tiny" Lister, who both proceeded to successful careers as "tough guy" character actors.

The story concerns two escaped convicts and a female assistant locomotive driver who are stuck on a runaway train as it barrels through snowy desolate Alaska. Voight and Roberts were both nominated for Academy Awards for their respective roles. It received generally positive reviews from critics.

Kurosawa intended the original screenplay to be his first color film following Red Beard, but difficulties with the American financial backers led to its being shelved.

Plot
Oscar "Manny" Manheim (Voight) is a ruthless bank robber and hero to the convicts of Alaska's Stonehaven Maximum Security Prison. After two previous escape attempts, Manny is put in solitary confinement for three years.  A court order compels sadistic Associate Warden Ranken to release him from solitary. Planning a third break out, Manny is forced to advance his plan to mid-winter after he is stabbed. Manny recruits young prisoner Buck McGeehy to help in the complicated plan. After escaping from the prison via a sewer tunnel that opens out above a freezing river, and an arduous cross-country hike, the two arrive at a switchyard. After stealing some railroad clothing, they hop on board a train, consisting only of four locomotives.

The elderly railroad engineer, Al, has a fatal heart attack after starting the train and falls off the lead locomotive. He manages to apply the brakes, but the locomotives overpower them; resulting in the brake shoes burning off. As the unmanned train accelerates, dispatchers Dave Prince and Frank Barstow are alerted to the situation. Barstow allows the train to reach onto the mainline, whilst trying to keep the tracks farther down the line clear. Unfortunately, the runaway smashes the caboose of another train pulling onto a siding. The collision badly damages the cab of the lead locomotive and jams the front door of the second engine, an old inoperable EMD F-unit, or "A-liner". The convicts finally realize something is wrong. Barstow's superior Eddie McDonald orders him to intentionally derail the train.

At this point, the train's horn blows, alerting the authorities (and the two fugitives) someone else is aboard the train. Barstow has the maintainer cancel the derailment. Ranken concludes his two escaped convicts are fleeing by rail. Meanwhile, the two fugitives are discovered by Sara, a locomotive hostler, who explains she sounded the horn and the train is out of control. She convinces them jumping off the train at its current speed would be suicide while revealing the only possible way to stop the train would be to climb forward onto the lead engine and press its kill switch, a near-impossible feat due to the A-liner's jammed front door and its obsolete rounded streamlined design's having no outside catwalk or handrail like the other three more-modern square-bodied locomotives. They manage to shut down the third and fourth locomotives, nearly derailing on a bridge while doing so.

The dispatchers divert the runaway onto a dead-end branch line after determining it is only five minutes away from a head-on collision with a passenger train. Further ahead the train has a tight curve near a chemical plant. Barstow agrees they must crash it, thus condemning all three on board to death, rather than risking a chemical explosion. Ranken forces Barstow to help him reach the train via helicopter. Manny tries forcing Buck into a suicidal scramble around the outside of the second engine's nose. Sara's intervention on Buck's behalf results in an armed face-off. Emotionally broken, all three slump into depression. Ranken's accomplice is lowered from a helicopter to the lead engine, but falls under the train after smashing through its windscreen. 
 
Spurred on by the appearance of his arch-enemy with an absolute resolve to not be returned to prison, Manny makes a perilous leap to the lead engine. He barely makes it, severely crushing his hand. Ranken boards the locomotive from the helicopter; Manny ambushes and handcuffs him inside the lead engine. Ranken orders Manny to stop the train before it crashes, but Manny has chosen to die rather than be recaptured. When reminded of Buck and Sara in the second engine, Manny uncouples the lead engine from the rest of the train. He waves goodbye without a word (ignoring Buck's screaming pleas to shut down the lead engine), and climbs onto the roof in the freezing snow, with his arms stretched out, accepting his inevitable fate. Buck and Manny's fellow inmates quietly mourn in their cells as the lone engine vanishes into the storm. The film closes with an on-screen quote from William Shakespeare's Richard III:

Cast

 Jon Voight as Oscar "Manny" Manheim
 Eric Roberts as Buck McGeehy
 Rebecca De Mornay as Sara
 Kyle T. Heffner as Frank Barstow
 John P. Ryan as Ranken
 T. K. Carter as Dave Prince
 Kenneth McMillan as Eddie MacDonald
 Stacey Pickren as Ruby
 Walter Wyatt as Conlan
 Edward Bunker as Jonah
 Reid Cruickshanks as Al Turner
 Dan Wray as Fat Con
 Michael Lee Gogin as Short Con
 John Bloom as Tall Con
 Norton E. "Hank" Worden as Old Con
 Daniel Trejo as Boxer
 Tiny Lister as Jackson, security guard
 Dennis Franz (uncredited) as Cop

Production

Akira Kurosawa
Akira Kurosawa read an article in a 1963 Life magazine by Warren Young about a runaway train. He thought it would make a good film and contacted Joseph E. Levine about doing an international co-production. In June 1966, Kurosawa announced he would make Runaway Train for Joseph E. Levine's Embassy Pictures. The budget was to be $5.6 million. The script was written by Kurosawa, Hideo Oguni and Ryuzo Kikushima, about two escaped convicts who hide on board a stationary train, only for it to roll away, gradually picking up tremendous speed. Sidney Carroll was hired to adapt Kurosawa's script into English. The film would be shot along tracks between Syracuse and Rochester in New York over 16 weeks in October 1966. Tetsuo Aoyagi would produce and the film would be shot in 70 mm.

Plans to shoot were cancelled at the last minute, only to be scheduled and cancelled yet again. In April 1967 the project had been "indefinitely postponed" and Kurosawa signed to make Tora! Tora! Tora!.

Development
In 1982 the Nippon Herald company, which owned Kurosawa's script, asked Francis Ford Coppola to recommend a director. Coppola and his producer, Tom Luddy, suggested Andrei Konchalovsky. The director succeeded in raising finance from Cannon Films.

"The design is still Kurosawa's", said Andrei Konchalovsky. "The concentration of energy and passion, the existential point of view, and the image of the train as something – perhaps civilization – out of control.... Manny, the character played by Voight, feels, 'Win or lose, what's the difference?' That's not very familiar to the Western mind. We tend to love winners, and we don't like losers."

Konchalovsky knew Jon Voight, who had helped get the director his visa to work in the US in 1979 (Voight wanted Konchalovsky to direct Rhinestone Heights which was ultimately never made.)

Karen Allen was announced for the female lead. The part ended up being played by Rebecca De Mornay, who said "It's my first real action-oriented picture. There are scenes where I'm walking across the top of a train – things like that. I really wanted to do something that called for a lot of physical acting, where I'm acting not as much with words as with my body."

The Alaska Railroad decided that their name and logo would not be shown. Several scenes referred to the railroad as "A&E Northern." The filming took place near Portage Glacier, Whittier, and Grandview.

Shooting
Principal photography began early 1985, at the Butte, Anaconda, & Pacific Roundhouse in Anaconda, Montana. During filming, the crew realized they didn't have any real snow, due to warm temperatures (a false spring) in the area. They used Christmas tree flock for fake snow, and they had to keep it from melting on the tracks at the west yard. Cannon Films had to cut short its stay in Anaconda, and they moved onto Deer Lodge, Montana, to film the prison scenes at the Old Montana State Prison. Approximately 200 extras were hired to play prisoners in the scenes. They spent a week filming several scenes at the prison. Finally the second unit team went to Whittier, Alaska, to film on the Alaska Railroad tracks. The Bridge sequence was filmed on the Seneca Bridge on Placer Creek, about 5 miles (8 km) from Whittier. The scene where Jordan makes the switch on the tracks was filmed at Portage, Alaska. The cast and crew went to the Pan-Pacific Auditorium in Los Angeles, to film the interior of the train scenes and the prisoners' escape scene.

The runaway train's lineup in the movie consisted of four Alaska Railroad locomotives, all built by EMD: GP40-2 #3010, F7 #1500, and #1801 and #1810, both GP7s. The latter two locomotives had previously been rebuilt by ARR with low short hoods as opposed to a GP7's original high short hood, but were fitted with mock-up high hoods made of plywood for the film, branded with fictional numbers 531 and 812, respectively. Because #1801's cab had been reconstructed prior to filming, the '531' prosthetic hood stood slightly higher than the normal hood height of a GP7 in order to fit over the locomotive's number-board.

The locomotives used in the film have gone their separate ways:
 ARR GP40-2 #3010 is still active on the Alaska Railroad, painted in the new corporate scheme.
 ARR F7 #1500 was retired from service in 1992, and is now at the Museum of Alaska Transportation and Industry Museum in Wasilla, Alaska, as can be seen on the front page of their website MuseumOfAlaska.org.
 ARR GP7 #1810 was sold to the Oregon Pacific Railroad and operated as OP #1810. In 2008, the unit was sold to the Cimarron Valley Railroad and is now permanently coupled to former OP Slug #1010.
 ARR GP7 #1801 was sold to a locomotive leasing company in Kansas City, Missouri, then sold to the Missouri Central Railroad and operated as MOC #1800. The locomotive subsequently appeared in another motion picture, Under Siege 2: Dark Territory, in 1995. MOC became the Central Midland Railroad in 2002.  As Central Midland had their own leased power, MOC 1800 was returned to Midwest Locomotive In Kansas City.  Shortly after, it was then sold the Respondek Rail Corp of Granite City, Illinois, and is now used on Respondek's Port Harbor Railroad subsidiary. The unit's identification is RRC #1800. As of 2015, the locomotive has been stored, out of service, needing wheel work. A return to service on the Port Harbor Railroad is unlikely, as there is talk about sending the unit to another Respondek Operation.
 The train that was hit by the runaway was led by MRS-1 #1605. This unit had been retired in 1984, one year before filming started. The unit has since been cut up for scrap.
 Sequences set at the rail yard, shot on the Butte, Anaconda and Pacific Railway in Anaconda, Montana, used local locomotives from the BA&P fleet along with former Northern Pacific EMD F9 #7012A, leased from the Mount Rainier Scenic Railroad. The two GP7s and the F9 were fitted with plywood boxes to duplicate the distinctive 'winterization hatches' carried on their Alaskan counterparts.
 BA&P EMD GP38-2 #109, the BA&P locomotive used in the yard scenes as the lead-engine in place of ARR #3010, was subsequently sold to the Alaska Railroad and remains in service there as #2002, along with sister unit #2001 (ex-BA&P #108).

Richard (Rick) Holley was killed prior to start of principal photography when the helicopter he was piloting hit power lines while scouting for shoot locations in Alaska. The film is dedicated to him during the closing credits.

Music
USSR Academic Russian Chorus is credited for Antonio Vivaldi's "Gloria". The film was scored by composer Trevor Jones.

Release

Box office
Runaway Train had its premiere in New York City on November 15, 1985, followed by its limited release in 965 theatres on December 6, 1985. It made $2,601,480 on that weekend. It was released nationwide on January 17, 1986 and was well received by critics, but failed to find an audience.  It opened in 8th place its premiere weekend, and failed to make back its production cost. The film also had a premiere in Anaconda, Montana at the Washoe Theater on March 20, 1986. Invitations for the premiere were sent to people from the department of Commerce, Rarus Railroad and Cannon Films personnel, as well as Jon Voight, Eric Roberts and Rebecca De Mornay. However, none of the actors could attend. The film made $7,936,012 worldwide.

Critical reception
Runaway Train received generally positive reviews, and has an 83% approval rating on Rotten Tomatoes based on 36 reviews, and an average rating of 7.3/10.The website's critical consensus states, "Charging forward with the momentum of a locomotive, Runaway Train makes great use of its adrenaline-fueled premise and star presences of Jon Voight and Eric Roberts". On Metacritic, the film has a weighted average score of 67 out of 100, based on 11 critics, indicating "generally favorable reviews". Janet Maslin, writing for The New York Times, felt that much of the film was absurd but that Jon Voight's performance was excellent, and she credits the film for "crude energy and bravado". In 2010, movie critic Michael Phillips said on his show At the Movies that it was the most under-rated movie of the 1980s. Roger Ebert awarded the film four out of four stars. Ebert wrote the opening prison scenes were well-made but routine, while the film's genius showed in the train sequences with "stunning" action scenes and the contrast between Roberts' "wild man" persona and Voight's "intelligent" convict; DeMornay's "role as an outsider gives them an audience and a mirror."

In 2014, Time Out polled several film critics, directors, actors and stunt actors to list their top action films. Runaway Train was listed at 64th place out of 100 on this list.

Accolades
The film was entered into the 1986 Cannes Film Festival.

Influence

Speed, a 1994 Hollywood film with a runaway bus, was inspired by Runaway Train. Screenwriter Graham Yost was told by his father, Canadian television host Elwy Yost, about Runaway Train, and that it was about a train that speeds out of control. Elwy mistakenly believed that the train's situation was due to a bomb on board. Such a theme had in fact been used in The Bullet Train. After seeing the Voight film, Graham decided that it would have been better if there had been a bomb on board a bus with the bus being forced to travel at 20 mph to prevent an actual explosion. A friend suggested that this be increased to 50 mph.

References

External links
 
 
 
 
 
 
 

1980s action thriller films
1980s disaster films
1980s prison films
1980s thriller drama films
1985 films
1985 independent films
American action thriller films
American disaster films
American independent films
American prison films
American survival films
American thriller drama films
1980s English-language films
Films directed by Andrei Konchalovsky
Films featuring a Best Drama Actor Golden Globe winning performance
Films scored by Trevor Jones
Films set in Alaska
Films set on trains
Films shot in Alaska
Films shot in Montana
Golan-Globus films
1985 drama films
Films produced by Menahem Golan
Films produced by Yoram Globus
1980s American films